The Mirabello class were a group of three destroyers(originally scout cruisers) built for the  (Royal Italian Navy) during World War I.  was sunk by a mine in the Black Sea during the Allied intervention in the Russian Civil War in 1920. The remaining two ships, obsolescent by 1938, were re-rated as destroyers and participated in World War II.  was also lost to a mine while escorting a convoy in 1941. The last surviving ship, was reconfigured as a convoy escort in 1942–1943. The torpedo tubes were removed and depth charges and  anti-aircraft guns added. She survived the war and was transferred to the Soviet Union as war reparations in 1946. The ship was scrapped five years later.

Design and description
The ships were designed as scout cruisers (esploratori), essentially enlarged versions of contemporary destroyers. Their complement was 8 officers and 161 enlisted men.

The Mirabellos were powered by two Parsons geared steam turbines, each driving one propeller shaft using steam supplied by four Yarrow boilers.

Their main battery consisted of eight 35-caliber Cannone da /35 S Modello 1914 guns in single mounts protected by gun shields, one each fore and aft of the superstructure on the centerline and the remaining guns positioned on the broadside amidships. Carlo Mirabello was the only ship completed to this configuration as her sister ships exchanged a 40-caliber Cannone da /40 A Modello 1891 for the forward 102 mm gun; Carlo Mirabello received hers in 1917. The gun proved to be too heavy for the ships and its rate of fire was too slow. Anti-aircraft (AA) defense for the Mirabello-class ships was provided by a pair of 40-caliber Cannone da /40 Modello 1916 AA guns in single mounts. They were equipped with four  torpedo tubes in two twin mounts, one on each broadside. Augusto Riboty could carry 120 mines, although her sisters could only handle 100.

Modifications
In 1919 the ships were rearmed with eight 45-caliber Cannone da 102/45 S, A Modello 1917 guns arranged as per Carol Mirabellos original configuration. The 76 mm guns were replaced by a pair of 39-caliber Cannone da /39 AA guns in single mounts in 1920–1922.

Ships

References

Bibliography

Further reading

External links
 Carlo Mirabello Marina Militare website

 

 
Destroyer classes
Destroyers of the Regia Marina
World War I naval ships of Italy
World War II destroyers of Italy
Ships built by Gio. Ansaldo & C.